Aporus is a genus of spider wasps from the family Pompilidae, they specialise in hunting ground dwelling spiders in their burrows for laying eggs on.

Species within Aporus include

Aporus andradei Wolf, 1970
Aporus apicatus Banks 1910
Aporus bicolor Spinola, 1808
Aporus concolor (Smith, 1860)
Aporus cuzco Evans, 1973
Aporus hirsutus (Banks, 1917) Blue Wasp
Aourus idris (Cameron, 1867)
Aporus japonicus Yasumatsu & Torikata 1934
Aporus luxus (Banks, 1914)
Aporus niger Cresson 1897
Aporus pollux (Kohl, 1888)
Aporus unicolor Spinola, 1808

References

Hymenoptera genera
Pompilinae